"Freeborn" is a term associated with political agitator John Lilburne (1614–1657).

Freeborn may also refer to:

Free negro
Free people of color
Freeborn (name)
Freeborn County, Minnesota, a county in Minnesota, United States
Freeborn, Minnesota, a city in Freeborn County, Minnesota, United States
Freeborn Lake, a lake in Douglas County, Minnesota, United States